A cave-in is a collapse of a geologic formation, mine or structure which may occur during mining, tunneling, or steep-walled excavation such as trenching. Geologic structures prone to spontaneous cave-ins include alvar, tsingy and other limestone formations, but can also include lava tubes and a variety of other subsurface rock formations. Glacier caves and other ice formations are very prone to collapse from exposure to warm temperatures or running water.

In mining, the term roof fall is used to refer to many types of collapses, ranging from the fall of a single flake of shale to collapses that form sink holes that reach to the surface. However, roof falls in mining are not all accidental. In longwall mining and retreat mining, miners systematically remove all support from under large areas of the mine roof, allowing it to settle just beyond the work area. The goal in such mining methods is not to prevent roof fall and the ensuing surface subsidence, but rather to control it.

Geological formations
 Alvar structures such as on the Stora Alvaret, Öland, Sweden 
 Karst limestone such as in the Madagascar dry deciduous forests

References

Caves
Mining terminology